Adolfo Alejandro Muñoz Cervantes (born 12 December 1997) is an Ecuadorian footballer who plays for Orense S.C..

Club career
He began his career with El Nacional in 2015.

Career statistics

References

1997 births
Living people
People from Buena Fe Canton
Association football midfielders
Ecuadorian footballers
Ecuador under-20 international footballers
Ecuador international footballers
Ecuadorian Serie A players
C.D. El Nacional footballers
L.D.U. Quito footballers